Asmahur may refer to:
Asmahur-e Olya
Asmahur-e Sofla